The Abjad numerals, also called Hisab al-Jummal, are a decimal alphabetic numeral system/alphanumeric code, in which the 28 letters of the Arabic alphabet are assigned numerical values. They have been used in the Arabic-speaking world since before the eighth century when positional Arabic numerals were adopted. In modern Arabic, the word  means 'alphabet' in general.

In the Abjad system, the first letter of the Arabic alphabet, ʾalif, is used to represent 1; the second letter, bāʾ, 2, up to 9. Letters then represent the first nine intervals of 10s and those of the 100s: yāʾ for 10, kāf for 20, qāf for 100, ending with 1000.

The word ʾabjad itself derives from the first four letters (A-B-J-D) of the Semitic alphabet, including the Aramaic alphabet, Hebrew alphabet, Phoenician alphabet, and other scripts for Semitic languages. These older alphabets contained only 22 letters, stopping at taw, numerically equivalent to 400. The Arabic Abjad system continues at this point with letters not found in other alphabets: thāʾ= 500, etc. Abjad numerals in Arabic are similar to the earlier alphanumeric codes of Hebrew gematria and Greek isopsephy.

Abjad order
The Abjad order of the Arabic alphabet has two slightly different variants. The Abjad order is not a simple historical continuation of the earlier north Semitic alphabetic order, since it has a position corresponding to the Aramaic letter samekh / semkat , yet no letter of the Arabic alphabet historically derives from that letter.

The most common Abjad sequence, read from right to left, is:

This is commonly vocalized as follows:مصر 
.
Another vocalization is:

Another Abjad sequence (probably older, now mainly confined to the Maghreb), is:

which can be vocalized as:

Another vocalization is:

Competing order
Modern dictionaries and other reference books use the newer  order, which partially groups letters together by similarity of shape:

A now-dated  Maghreb order exists (replaced by the Mashriqi order):

Persian dictionaries use a slightly different order, in which و comes before ه instead of after it.

Uses of the Abjad system
Before the Hindu–Arabic numeral system, the abjad as numbers were used for all mathematical purposes. In modern Arabic, they are primarily used for numbering outlines, items in lists, and points of information. Equivalent to English, "A.", "B.", and "C." (or, rarer, Roman numerals: I, II, III, IV), in Arabic, thus "", then "", then "", not the first three letters of the modern  order.

The abjad numbers are also used to assign numerical values to Arabic words for purposes of numerology.  The common Islamic phrase   ('In the name of Allah, the most merciful, the most compassionate' – see Basmala) has a numeric value of 786 (from a letter-by-letter cumulative value of 2+60+40+1+30+30+5+1+30+200+8+40+50+1+30+200+8+10+40). The name Allāh  by itself has the value 66 (1+30+30+5).

Letter values

A few of the numerical values are different in the alternative Abjad order: 
For four Persian letters these values are used:

Similar systems

The Abjad numerals are equivalent to the earlier Hebrew numerals up to 400. The Hebrew numeral system is known as Gematria and is used in Kabbalistic texts and numerology. Like the Abjad order, it is used in modern times for numbering outlines and points of information, including the first six days of the week. The Greek numerals differ in a number of ways from the Abjad ones (for instance in the Greek alphabet there is no equivalent for). The Greek language system of letters-as-numbers is called isopsephy. In modern times the old 27-letter alphabet of this system also continues to be used for numbering lists.

See also

Eastern Arabic numerals
Western Arabic numerals
Kufic
Hurufism
'Ilm al-Huruf (science of letters)
Gematria
Isopsephy
Katapayadi system

References

External links
Overview of the abjad numerological system
Sufi numerology site
Numerical Value of an Arabic Text as per "Abjad" Calculation - www.alavibohra.org

Numerals
Collation